The 1948 Chico State Wildcats football team represented Chico State College—now known as California State University, Chico—as a member of the Far Western Conference (FWC) during the 1948 college football season. The team outscored its opponents 101 to 79 for the season. The Wildcats played home games at Chico High School Stadium in Chico, California.

Schedule

Notes

References

Chico State
Chico State Wildcats football seasons
Northern California Athletic Conference football champion seasons
Chico State Wildcats football